Hijo Aaja Bholi (a.k.a. Hijo, Aaja, Bholi) was the fourth Nepali film produced and the first under a private banner. This movie features Shreedhar Khanal, Bhuwan Chand, Mitra Lal, Shanti Maskey and Uttam Nepali in the lead roles. Shreedhar Khanal also wrote the story, screenplay and dialogues. He was also the lyricist and the chief assistant director. When Hira Singh Khatri fell ill while shooting the major portions in the studios of Calcutta, Khanal took the responsibility on his shoulders to see the work was not disturbed.

Plot 
Hijio Aaja Bholi tells the story about whats happens today tomorrow and yesterday .

Cast 
Shreedhar Khanal
 Bhuwan Chand
 Mitra Lal
 Shanti Maskey
 Uttam Nepali
 Basundhara Bhusal
 Indra Lal Shrestha
 Hira Singh Khatri
 Pradeep Rimal

References 

Nepalese drama films
Nepali-language films
Nepalese black-and-white films
1968 films